Money is an Australian factual television program that was broadcast on the Nine Network as a regular weekly series from 1993 to 2002. It also appeared as occasional specials from 2002 to 2006. Money was a financial and investment program, hosted by Paul Clitheroe.

The series spawned a successful magazine called Money, which is still published today.

See also 
 List of Australian television series
 List of Nine Network programs

References

Australian non-fiction television series
Nine Network original programming
1993 Australian television series debuts
2002 Australian television series endings